"You Have Killed Me" is the first single from English alternative rock singer Morrissey's eighth studio album, Ringleader of the Tormentors (2006). The single, written by Morrissey and Jesse Tobias, was released on 27 March 2006. Morrissey said it would showcase the "marked difference in sound" brought about by the new influence of Tobias on Morrissey's work while Billboard magazine described it as a "simple, effective first single". Upon its release, the song peaked at number three on the UK Singles Chart and reached the top 10 in Denmark, Finland, Ireland, and Sweden.

Lyrical content

The lyric references Pier Paolo Pasolini's 1961 film, Accattone, about prostitution in the slums of Rome, as is shown in the first two lines of the lyrics ("Pasolini is me"/"Accattone you'll be").  There is much speculation as to the meaning of this quote. Some fans believe it is merely an example of Rome's influence on Morrissey, whereas others feel it is a reference to the loss of virginity, since Accattone is Pasolini's first film. A picture of Terence Stamp, main character of Pasolini's movie Teorema, was also chosen by Morrissey as cover of one of The Smiths early singles, "What Difference Does It Make?".

The lyric also mentions Anna Magnani, Luchino Visconti, and in some live performances Fellini. The references to Anna Magnani and Luchino Visconti probably refer to the Visconti's segment of the anthology film Siamo Donne, in which actresses are shown in their everyday lives, rather than as glamorous or sexualised. Anna Magnani frequently portrayed ordinary women who sacrificed everything for her family, as in Visconti's Bellissima or Pasolini's Mamma Roma.

Track listings

UK CD1 and 7-inch single
 "You Have Killed Me"  – 3:08
 "Good Looking Man About Town"  – 2:53

UK CD2
 "You Have Killed Me"  – 3:08
 "Human Being"  – 6:08
 "I Knew I Was Next"  – 3:46
 "You Have Killed Me" (video)

US CD single
 "You Have Killed Me"  – 3:08
 "Human Being"  – 6:08
 "I Knew I Was Next"  – 3:46
 "Good Looking Man About Town"  – 2:53

Personnel
 Morrissey: voice
 Boz Boorer: guitar
 Jesse Tobias: guitar
 Alain Whyte: guitar
 Gary Day: bass
 Michael Farrell: keyboard
 Matt Chamberlain: drums

Charts

Release history

References

External links
 Single info
 Q&A
 Billboard magazine preview
 The "official" Morrissey MySpace page

Morrissey songs
2005 songs
2006 singles
Sanctuary Records singles
Song recordings produced by Tony Visconti
Songs written by Jesse Tobias
Songs written by Morrissey